Jenna Blasman (born September 24, 1993) is a Canadian snowboarder. She competes in slopestyle and represented Canada in this event at the 2014 Winter Olympics in Sochi.

References

1993 births
Living people
Canadian female snowboarders
Sportspeople from Kitchener, Ontario
Snowboarders at the 2014 Winter Olympics
Olympic snowboarders of Canada